The 2016–17 Croatian Premier Handball League is the 26th season of the Premier League, Croatia's premier Handball league.

Team information 

The following 12 clubs compete in the Premijer liga during the 2016–17 season:

Regular season

Standings

Results

Championship Round

Standings

Relegation Round 

All teams keep their points from the regular season.

Standings

References

External links
 Croatian Handball Federaration 

2016–17 domestic handball leagues